The 2011 Puskás Cup was the fourth edition of the Puskás Cup and took place 6 April to 8 April. Budapest Honvéd FC were the defending champions and they won their second title by defeating Real Madrid on penalty shoot-out (5-4) after a 1–1 draw in the final.

Participating teams
 Budapest Honvéd (former club of Ferenc Puskás)
 Ferencváros (invited)
 Hagi Football Academy (invited)
 Panathinaikos (former club of Ferenc Puskás)
 Puskás Academy (host)
 Real Madrid (former club of Ferenc Puskás)

Venues
Felcsút

Results
All times are local (UTC+2).

Group A

Group B

Fifth place play-off

Third place play-off

Final

References

External links
Official website

2010
2010–11 in Spanish football
2010–11 in Hungarian football
2010–11 in Greek football
2010–11 in Romanian football